Pomfret is a town in Windham County, Connecticut, United States.  The population was 4,266 in 2020 according to the 2020 United States Census. The land was purchased from Native Americans in 1686 (the "Mashmuket Purchase" or "Mashamoquet Purchase") and the town was incorporated in 1713 and named after Pontefract in West Yorkshire, England.

Geography
Pomfret is bordered on the north by Woodstock, on the east by Putnam and Killingly, on the west by Eastford, and on the south by Brooklyn and Hampton.

Villages
Pomfret includes several villages, neighborhoods, or sections:
 Abington
 Elliotts
 Pomfret
 Pomfret Center
 Pomfret Landing

Other geographic features

The principal roads through the town are U.S. Route 44 (running east–west) and Routes 169 (running north–south), and 101 (running east–west).

Mashamoquet State Park and Wolf Den State Park are both located in Pomfret, near the intersection of US 44 and CT 101. Wolf Den State Park is the alleged site of General Israel Putnam's slaying of the last wolf in Connecticut. Rocky paths connect join the small cave which is the actual wolf den with a glacially positioned boulder called the Indian Chair. Camping and cook-out facilities are available for a nominal fee.

The Air Line Trail, a former railroad bed, joins the town of Pomfret with its neighbor to the east, Putnam.  The Airline Trail runs seven miles (11 km), much of it through an Audubon Society property named the Bafflin Sanctuary, a  nature preserve.

Pomfret has no formal town center due to the town's significant southward expansion after its establishment, first around Mortlake, later absorbing that town.  The town office is located on US Route 44.  The Congregational Church, until its destruction by fire on December 7, 2013, stood on the eastern edge of the old town green on Pomfret Hill, across from the Pomfret School, a college preparatory school founded in 1894. About a mile north of the Congregational Church site is Christ Episcopal Church, which contains several windows designed and constructed by Louis Comfort Tiffany. Across from Christ Church on the west side of Route 44 is the Rectory School, founded in 1920.  At the divergence point of US 44 and CT 169 is Most Holy Trinity Roman Catholic Church.

Town House Road is the location of the historic Pomfret Town House, built in 1841 at a location chosen by a committee of Selectmen from neighboring towns when Pomfret citizens could not agree on a location; it is listed on the National Register. Pomfret First Church was established in today's Pomfret Hill area; Pomfret Second Church covered what is largely today's Town of Brooklyn; while Pomfret Third Church was established in today's Abington area.

Demographics

As of the census of 2010, there were 4,247 people, 1,582 households, and 1,123 families residing in the town. The racial makeup of the town was 95.7% White, 0.6% African American, 0.1% Native American, 1.6% Asian, 0.3% from other races, and 1.6% from two or more races. Hispanic or Latino of any race were 1.9% of the population.

Of the 1,582 households: 31.5% had children under the age of 18 living with them, 60.3% were married couples living together, 7.5% had a female householder with no husband present, and 29.0% were non-families. 22.8% of all households were made up of individuals, and 6.9% had someone living alone who was 65 years of age or older.  The average household size was 2.57 and the average family size was 3.05.

In the town, the population was spread out, with 24.8% under the age of 18, 6.9% from 18 to 24, 23.4% from 25 to 44, 32.6% from 45 to 64, and 12.3% who were 65 years of age or older.  The median age was 42 years. For every 100 females, there were 97.4 males.  For every 100 females age 18 and over, there were 96.6 males.

The median income for a household in the town was $82,661, and the median income for a family was $96,641. Males had a median income of $54,042 versus $45,526 for females. The per capita income for the town was $39,712.  About 3.8% of families and 6.3% of the population were below the poverty line, including 6.5% of those under age 18 and 6.4% of those age 65 or over.

Economy
Major firms in Pomfret include: 
 Loos & Co.

Education
Pomfret residents are zoned to the Pomfret Community School for grades Kindergarten through 8. Pomfret students are eligible to attend Woodstock Academy, which became Pomfret's zoned high school in 1987

Two private schools, the Pomfret School and the Rectory School, are also located in Pomfret.

Historic sites
A  portion of the town, along Pomfret Street, is listed as a historic district on the U.S. National Register of Historic Places. The Pomfret Street Historic District comprises properties along Route 169, from Bradley Road to Woodstock Road. The district was added to the National Register in 1998.

Other properties listed on the National Register in the town are:
 Brayton Grist Mill – US 44 (added 1986)
 Gwyn Careg US 44 (added 1994)
 Israel Putnam Wolf Den – Off Wolf Den Road (added 1985)
 Pomfret Town House – Town House Road (added 1989)

Notable people

 Jim Calhoun (born 1942), former head coach of the University of Connecticut's men's basketball team, lives in the town
 Effingham Capron (1791–1859), born in Pomfret, anti-slavery champion at Uxbridge, MA, state and national anti-slavery leader
 John Capron (1756–1834), "clothier" at Pomfret, built first woolen power looms at Uxbridge, MA
 Augustus Sabin Chase (1827–1896), industrialist of Waterbury, Connecticut 
 Rivers Cuomo (born 1970), member of American rock band Weezer, lived in the town
 Ernest Flagg (1857–1947), designer of the Singer Building designed the main buildings of the Pomfret School Campus
 Lemuel Goodell (1800–1897), Wisconsin politician
 Nathan Goodell (1798–1883), Mayor of Green Bay, Wisconsin
 Roswell Eaton Goodell (1825–1903), politician and businessman
 Bertram Goodhue (1869–1924), an architect renowned for his work in the neo-Gothic style and the designer of notable typefaces, was born in town
 Robert Hillyer (1895–1961), poet, novelist, and critic, lived in the town
 Asa Lyon (1763–1841) a United States representative from Vermont was born in town
 Louise Chandler Moulton (1835–1908), poet, story-writer, and critic, was born in town
 Israel Putnam (1718–1790), a major general serving George Washington, lived in the town
 Swami Satchidananda (1914–2002), Indian religious figure, lived in the town
 Solomon Spalding (1761–1816), is believed to have authored the Manuscript Story while staying at the Post Road Tavern in the town
 Warren L. Wheaton (1812–1903) philanthropist and co-founder and namesake of Wheaton College and Wheaton, Illinois, was born in Pomfret
 James Abbott McNeill Whistler (1834–1903), a painter and printmaker, lived in the town
 Renée Zellweger (born 1969), Academy Award-winning actress, owned a home in the town

See also

 Abington Congregational Church

References

External links

 Town government Web site

 
Towns in Windham County, Connecticut
Towns in Connecticut
1713 establishments in Connecticut
Populated places established in 1713